Richard Niehuus (6 July 1917 – 17 June 2005) was an Australian cricketer. He played in ten first-class matches for South Australia between 1946 and 1948.

See also
 List of South Australian representative cricketers

References

External links
 

1917 births
2005 deaths
Australian cricketers
South Australia cricketers
Cricketers from Adelaide